Kim Ho-soon (김호순; born 1926) is a former South Korean cyclist. He competed at the 1952 and 1956 Summer Olympics. In 1956, Kim Ho-soon finished 37th on the men's individual road out of 88 at the Korea Cycling Olympics for the first time in Olympic history.

References

External links
 

1926 births
Possibly living people
South Korean male cyclists
Olympic cyclists of South Korea
Cyclists at the 1952 Summer Olympics
Cyclists at the 1956 Summer Olympics
Asian Games medalists in cycling
Cyclists at the 1958 Asian Games
Medalists at the 1958 Asian Games
Asian Games gold medalists for South Korea
Asian Games bronze medalists for South Korea